Micropholis williamii is a species of plant in the family Sapotaceae. It is endemic to Brazil.

References

Flora of Brazil
williamii
Conservation dependent plants
Taxonomy articles created by Polbot
Taxa named by François Pellegrin
Taxa named by André Aubréville